Gold Fever is a 1952 American Western film directed by Leslie Goodwins and starring John Calvert, Ralph Morgan and Gene Roth.

Cast
 John Calvert as John Bonar
 Ralph Morgan as Nugget Jack
 Ann Cornell as Rusty
 Gene Roth as Bill Johnson
 Tom Kennedy as Big Tom
 Judd Holdren as Jud Jerson
 Danny Rense as Ward Henry
 Robert Graham as Cougar
 George Morrell as Recorder of Claims

References

Bibliography
 Pitts, Michael R. Western Movies: A Guide to 5,105 Feature Films. McFarland, 2012.

External links
 

1952 films
1952 Western (genre) films
American Western (genre) films
Films directed by Leslie Goodwins
Monogram Pictures films
1950s English-language films
1950s American films